Muzarabani is a district, which is relatively flat and situated along the Mocambique-Zimbabwe border in Mashonaland Central province in Zimbabwe.

Populated places in Mashonaland Central Province